Shaun Raymond Came (born 15 June 1983) is an English former professional footballer who played as a defender in the Football League for Macclesfield Town. He also played non-league football for clubs including Northwich Victoria and Winsford United. He is the son of former footballer Mark Came.

References

External links
 

1983 births
Living people
People from Winsford
English footballers
Association football defenders
Macclesfield Town F.C. players
Northwich Victoria F.C. players
Winsford United F.C. players
English Football League players
National League (English football) players